Hilarographa aurosa is a species of moth of the family Tortricidae. It is found on Yakushima Island in Japan.

References

Moths described in 1976
Hilarographini
Moths of Japan